This is the complete list of Asian Games medalists in rowing from 1982 to 2018.

Men

Single sculls

Double sculls

Quadruple sculls

Coxless pair

Coxed pair

Coxless four

Coxed four

Coxed eight

Lightweight single sculls

Lightweight double sculls

Lightweight quadruple sculls

Lightweight coxless four

Lightweight coxed eight

Women

Single sculls

Double sculls

Quadruple sculls

Coxless pair

Coxless four

Coxed four

Lightweight single sculls

Lightweight double sculls

Lightweight quadruple sculls

Lightweight coxless four

References

External links
 Medallists from previous Asian Games – Rowing

Rowing
medalists

Asian